= Chakale =

Village in Maharashtra, India

- Village
- Interactive map of Chakale
- Country: India
- State: Maharashtra
- District: Ratnagiri

Chakale is a village in Ratnagiri district, Maharashtra state in Western India. The 2011 Census of India recorded 1,205 residents in the village. Chakale's geographical area is approximately 430 hectares (1,100 acres).
